"I've Grown Accustomed to Her Face" is a song from the 1956 musical My Fair Lady, with music by Frederick Loewe and lyrics by Alan Jay Lerner. It was originally performed by Rex Harrison as Professor Henry Higgins  who also performed it in the 1964 film version.

Background
The song expresses Professor Henry Higgins's rage at the fact that his pupil Eliza Doolittle has chosen to walk out of his life, and his growing realization of how much he will miss her.

Recorded versions

  
Ronnie Aldrich
Herb Alpert & the Tijuana Brass, later covered it on their 1964 album South of the Border (A&M Records LP-108 (mono), A&M Records SP-108 (stereo)).
Chet Baker
Count Basie
Tony Bennett
Chris Botti
Ruby Braff
Cecil Brooks III
Les Brown & his Band of Renown
Jimmy Bruno
Joe Bushkin
Jerry Butler
Jackie Cain
Richard Clayderman
Jay Clayton
Petula Clark
Nat King Cole
Ray Conniff
Bernard Cribbins
Bing Crosby recorded the song in 1956 for use on his radio show and it was subsequently included in the box set The Bing Crosby CBS Radio Recordings (1954-56) issued by Mosaic Records (catalog MD7-245) in 2009. 
Rosemary Clooney
Jesse Davis Quartet
Sammy Davis Jr.
Doris Day
Paul Desmond
Marlene Dietrich
Arne Domnérus and his orchestra
Eastern Rebellion (jazz quartet)
Billy Eckstine
Dewey Erney
Gloria Estefan
Connie Evingson
Douglas Fairbanks Jr.
Percy Faith
Michael Feinstein
Eddie Fisher
Molly Flannery
Shelby Flint
Bruce Forman
Sergio Franchi - Broadway, I Love You (1963)
Forty Second Street Singers
Art Garfunkel - Some Enchanted Evening (2007)
Marvin Gaye - When I'm Alone I Cry album (1964)
Stan Getz with Cal Tjader
Jackie Gleason
Golden State Orchestra & Singers
Benny Goodman
John Greaves
Buddy Greco
Stewie Griffin (In Family Guy, as "I've Grown Accustomed to Her Face")
Frank Haley
Eddie Harris
Sam Harris
Rex Harrison
Coleman Hawkins
Buck Hill
Lena Horne
Jeremy Irons
Milt Jackson
Maria João
Jack Jones
Quincy Jones on My Fair Lady Loves Jazz 
Roger Kellaway
Barney Kessel
Stacey Kent - The Lyric (2005)
Diana Krall
Steve Lawrence
Peggy Lee
Alec McCowen
Gordon MacRae
Shelly Manne - My Fair Lady  (1956) (with André Previn)
Mantovani
Dean Martin recorded the song May 9, 1960 for his album, This Time I'm Swingin' (Capitol T-1442 (mono), ST-1442 (stereo)). It was later remastered in 2007 as a duet with smooth jazz trumpeter Chris Botti for Martin's album Forever Cool and Botti's Italia respectively.
Johnny Mathis made his recording in 1957 for his album Warm.
Susannah McCorkle - The People That You Never Get To Love (1981)
Martine McCutcheon
Brad Mehldau
Matt Monro
Wes Montgomery - Full House (Live at Tsubo, Berkeley, CA) (Riverside Records, 1962)
Peter Nero
Veronica Nunn
Oscar Peterson
Louis Prima and Keely Smith
Ian Richardson
Sonny Rollins (as "I've Grown Accustomed to Your Face")
Edmundo Ros
Mathilde Santing
Robert Underdunk Terwilliger (Sideshow Bob) (In The Simpsons, as "The Very Reason That I Live")
Rod Stewart
Barbra Streisand, subsequently, on her 2016 album Encore: Movie Partners Sing Broadway, Streisand performs the song (combined with "I'll Be Seeing You" from the 1938 musical Right This Way), as a duet with actor Chris Pine.
Tierney Sutton
James Taylor
The Temptations
Claude Thornhill and his orchestra
McCoy Tyner
Tim Warfield Quintet, 1997 release Gentle Warrior.
Andy Williams

In popular media

In the film Thunderball, James Bond, while dancing with SPECTRE assassin Fiona Volpe, tells her “Strange as it may seem, I’ve grown accustomed to your face.”
Kermit the Frog performed this song several times during the 1950s, '60s and '70s, though at that time he was not yet a frog. In this case, the character wore a wig while lipsyncing to Rosemary Clooney's recording of the song, singing to a small creature that is covered entirely by a piece of cloth with a face drawn on it. As "she" sings, the creature eats the mask off its own head, revealing itself to be the Muppet character Yorick (from Sam and Friends). Kermit keeps singing though, even as Yorick tries to munch on his hand and later his leg. Later on, Brian Henson (son of Jim Henson, the original performer of Kermit) and Leslie Carrara-Rudolph recreated the famous sketch for the Henson Alternative Show Stuffed and Unstrung and at the D23 Expo, once again using the Rosemary Clooney soundtrack.
Barbra Streisand performed several lines in her "Color Me Barbra Medley" from the TV special and album Color Me Barbra.
 Schroeder references the song's title in the Peanuts film "Is This Goodbye, Charlie Brown?" and states "Don't tell me I've grown accustomed to that face."
Stewie Griffin sings his version in the Family Guy episode "Running Mates"
Sideshow Bob sings his own version of this song ("The Very Reason That I Live") in The Simpsons (in the Season 14 episode The Great Louse Detective).
Henry speaks this line to Eliza on Selfie episode 5, at the end of the episode.

References

External links 
 , 2001 London revival
 , Nat King Cole
 , Tony Bennett, Count Basie
 , Sonny Rollins (instrumental)
 , Chet Baker (instrumental)
 , from Sam and Friends, starring Kermit the Frog and Yorick

1956 songs
Songs with music by Frederick Loewe
Songs with lyrics by Alan Jay Lerner
Johnny Mathis songs
Barbra Streisand songs
Andy Williams songs
Songs from My Fair Lady